Thonnakkal is a village in  Thiruvananthapuram district in Kerala, India. It is located on the National Highway 47 on the way to Kollam from the state's capital. It is located about 25 km from the state's capital Thiruvananthapuram.

Mahakavi Kumaranasan, a major poet of Malayalam literature lived in Thonnakkal for long time and his major literary contributions came while he was staying in Thonnakkal. Birthplace of the late Mahakavi Kumaranasan, is near Kayikkara in Thiruvananthapuram District. The house of Kumaranasan is now converted into a tourist spot named Kumaranasan Smarakom.

The place has also given birth to Kathakali artistes like Thonnakkal Peethambaran and Margi Vijayakumar. Thonnakkal is also well known for sports such as Volley Ball. Thonnakkal owns its own Volleyball Team based upon Thonnakkal Samskarika Samithi.

References

Kathakali
Suburbs of Thiruvananthapuram
Villages in Thiruvananthapuram district